Kaura Khan Qaisrani was the Ziledar of Tibbi Qaisrani. He was also the Wadera of his clan when the son of Sardar Mitha Khan Qaisrani,  Sardar Fazal Ilahi Khan was chief of Qaisrani baloch tribe during 18th century. Kora khan had a territory expanding over 10,000 acres which is now known as Tibbi Qaisrani, in tehsil Taunsa district Dera Ghazi khan.

Recounting the story
As Baloch herdsmen lead their sheep and goats across the wild and desolate gorges in search of forage forever scarce, they sing the vars (ballads) of their heroes. One that resounds across the Suleman crags is the story of Kaura Khan of the Qaisrani tribe.  Not only is it sung in verse, it is narrated in prose as well — all of its several versions that vary but slightly.

The story
Kaura Khan was a cunning man and honorary wadera of lashkari clan of Qaisrani tribe. It was the time of British rule in  subcontinent, when one day Jahangir khan(son of Kora khan) was hunting wild bird,but unfortunately the bullet hit a man passing by. The British DC Lieutenant Grey was not so far from there and got complaint of a murder by Jahangir khan. The Lieutenant reached Kora khan's house for arresting Jahangir. Kora Khan considered it against the norms and Baloch tradition thus kidnapped the Lieutenant Grey. His hands and mouth were bounded and was taken to Mountainous Tuman Qaisrani(Qaisrani's tribal area). Kaura Khan kept him there for few days and then released him. After that, Kaura khan moved to Musa Khail where he took shelter at Musa Khail Sardar's place. Subsequently, with the help of stool pigeons, kora khan got arrested and then punished.

References

Year of birth missing
Year of death missing
Baloch people